Wiesen is a German language habitational surname. Notable people with the name include:
 Jonas Wiesen (1996), German coxswain
 Jonathan Wiesen, American history professor

German-language surnames
German toponymic surnames